Coleophora dividua is a moth of the family Coleophoridae. It is found in Turkestan.

References

dividua
Moths described in 1986
Moths of Asia